Escape or Escaping may refer to:

Arts and media

Film
 Escape (1928 film), a German silent drama film
 Escape! (film), a  1930 British crime film starring Austin Trevor and Edna Best
 Escape (1940 film), starring Robert Taylor and Norma Shearer, based on the novel by Ethel Vance
 Escape (1948 film), starring Rex Harrison 
 Escape (1971 film), a television movie starring Christopher George and William Windom
 Escape (1980 film), a television movie starring Timothy Bottoms and Colleen Dewhurst
 Escape (1988 film), an Egyptian film directed by Atef El-Tayeb
 Escape (2012 American film), a thriller starring C. Thomas Howell, John Rhys-Davies, Anora Lyn
 Escape (2012 Norwegian film), a thriller film originally titled Flukt
 Escapes (film), a 2017 documentary film about Blade Runner screenwriter Hampton Fancher
 Escape (2021 film), an upcoming Malayalam film starring Santhosh Keezhattoor

Literature

Books
Escape! The Story of the Great Houdini, a 2006 book by Sid Fleischman
 Escape (Jessop and Palmer book), a 2007 book about Jessop's upbringing in a Fundamentalist Church of Jesus Christ of Latter-Day Saints polygamous community
 Escape (Choose Your Own Adventure), a Choose Your Own Adventure book
 Escape (McMillan book), a 2008 autobiographical book by smuggler David McMillan
 Escape, a 1939 novel by Grace Zaring Stone under the pseudonym Ethel Vance
 Escape, a 2022 novel by K.R. Alexander.

Other literature
 Escape (play), a 1926 play by the British writer John Galsworthy
 Escape (magazine), a British comic strip magazine published between 1983 and 1989
 "Escape!", a 1945 science fiction short story by Isaac Asimov
 Escape (manga), a 1981 short manga by Akira Toriyama

Music

Albums 
 Escape, a 2022 EP by Daoko with Yohji Igarashi
 Escape (EP), a 2012 EP by Kim Hyung-jun
 Escape (Enrique Iglesias album), or the title song (see below), 2001
 Escape (Jody Harris and Robert Quine album), 1981
 Escape (Journey album), or the title song, 1981
 Escape (Nine Lashes album), 2009
 Escape (Ram-Zet album), 2002
 Escape (Whodini album), or the title song, 1984

Songs 
 "Escape" (Enrique Iglesias song), 2001
 "Escape" (Misia song), 2000
 "Escape (The Piña Colada Song)", 1979 song by Rupert Holmes
 "Escape", a song by Hoobastank from The Reason
 "Escape", a song by Kehlani from SweetSexySavage
 "Escape", a song by Craig Armstrong
 "Escape", a song by Matisyahu from Light
 "Escape", a song by Metallica from Ride the Lightning
 "Escape", a song by Muse from Showbiz
 "Escape", a song by Alice Cooper from the 1975 album Welcome to My Nightmare
 "Escaping" (song), 1989 song by Margaret Urlich
 "Escaping", a song by Blues Traveler from the single "Run-Around", 1995
 "Escaping", a song by High Flight Society from the album High Flight Society, 2007
 "Escaping", a song by Kiko Loureiro from the album No Gravity, 2005
 "Escaping", a song by Kathryn Williams from the album Over Fly Over, 2005
 "Escape", a 2022 song by Kx5 and Hayla

Radio
 Escape (radio program), a radio drama series on CBS
 Escape (Sirius XM), a music channel on satellite radio

Television
 Escape (TV network), American TV network now named Ion Mystery since 2022
 Escape (1950 TV series), a 1950 American drama anthology series that aired on CBS
 Escape (1973 TV series), a 1973 American adventure anthology series that aired on NBC
 Escape (British TV series), a 1957 British anthology series
 Escape, a Thomas the Tank Engine and Friends episode

Video games
 Escape (video game), a ZX Spectrum video game developed and released by New Generation Software in 1982
 Westone Bit Entertainment, a video game company formerly known as Escape

Science and technology

Computing
 Escape character, a character that signifies that what follows takes an alternative interpretation
 Escape sequence, a series of characters used to trigger some sort of command state in computers
 Escape key, the "Esc" key on a computer keyboard

Life sciences
 Antigenic escape, inability to respond to an infectious agent
 Escape response, instinctive behaviour in animals

Space science
 Extreme-ultraviolet Stellar Characterization for Atmospheric Physics and Evolution, a NASA Small Explorer satellite
 Escape from a gravitationally bound orbit, by exceeding escape velocity

Other uses
 Ford Escape, a small sport utility vehicle
 Prison escape, the act of breaking out of prison

See also
 The Escape (disambiguation)
 Escapism, mental diversion by means of entertainment or recreation
 Escapology, the study and practice of escaping from physical restraints
 E-scape, an educational assessment project at Goldsmiths University, London
 Escapa (disambiguation)
 Xscape (disambiguation)
 Escape Cliffs, a historic settlement site in the Northern Territory, Australia